Thinking Fellers Union Local 282 were an American experimental indie rock group, which was formed in 1986 in San Francisco though half of its members are from Iowa.
Their albums combine lo-fi noise rock and ambient sounds (referred to as "Feller filler") with tightly constructed rock and pop songs. There is a small but fiercely devoted cult following for the band. Brian Hageman, Mark Davies, Anne Eickelberg, Hugh Swarts, and Jay Paget make up the band. Hageman was a part of the Horny Genius band, which is based in Iowa City.

The band achieved their greatest critical and commercial success in the mid-1990s, when they signed with the indie rock label Matador Records. It was during this time that Thinking Fellers produced their most prominent albums, Lovelyville, and Strangers from the Universe. They toured the Netherlands, Germany, Switzerland and the UK in 1994 and made an appearance on the John Peel radio show on the BBC. In 1996 they toured briefly as an opening act for the then-popular band Live but were not received well by the Live fanbase. Thinking Fellers has been largely dormant since 1996, having toured sporadically and released only one full album, Bob Dinners and Larry Noodles Present Tubby Turdner's Celebrity Avalanche, since.

Elf Power's 1999 album A Dream In Sound featured a cover of Thinking Fellers Union Local 282's song "Noble Experiment."

In 2001, author Jonathan Franzen referenced the band in his novel The Corrections. The character Brian, a snobbish fan of "west coast underground bands," listens to the albums of Thinking Fellers while writing the music software that will make him a young millionaire.

On January 7, 2011, the All Tomorrow's Parties festival announced a Thinking Fellers Union Local 282 performance at the ATP festival weekend May 13–15, 2011 curated by Animal Collective.

In 2017, Beverly Williams's book Survival Kit's Apocalypse quoted the lines "If the sadness of life makes you tired/And the failures of man make you sigh/You can look to the time soon arriving/When this noble experiment winds down and calls it a day" from the Fellers' song "Noble Experiment" from Strangers from the Universe. In 2019, The National interpolated those same lines in their song "Not in Kansas" on the album I Am Easy to Find.

Discography

Studio albums
Wormed by Leonard Thwart Productions 1988
Tangle Thwart Productions 1989 / Scratch Records 1995
Lovelyville Matador Records 1991
Mother of All Saints Matador Records 1992
Strangers from the Universe Matador Records 1994
I Hope It Lands Communion 1996
Bob Dinners and Larry Noodles Present Tubby Turdner's Celebrity Avalanche Communion 2001

Singles and EPs
"2×4's" / "Horrible Hour" 7-inch Nuf Sed 1990
The Natural Finger 7-inch Ajax Records 1990
"Outhouse of the Pryeeeeeeee" / "Wheat Delusion" split 7-inch w/ Sun City Girls Nuf Sed 1991
Where's Officer Tuba 12-inch Hemiola Records 1993
Admonishing the Bishops Matador Records 1993
The Funeral Pudding Ajax Records/Brinkman (Waaghaals) 1994
"Everyday" / "A Fistful of Dollars" 7-inch Amarillo Records 1995
"The Kids Are In The Mud" / "Broken Bones" 7-inch Japan Overseas 1996

Compilation albums
TFUL282 Japan Overseas 1995
Eyesore – A Stab at the Residents Vaccination Records 1996 (cover of The Residents' "Electrocutioner")
Porcelain Entertainments Normal Records 1995 / Runt 2000
Duck, Duck, Chimp (Rarities 1987–2001) 2002

References

External links

 
 Communion Label TFUL282 site
 Matador Records TFUL282 site
 SFWeekly article
 

Indie rock musical groups from California
American noise rock music groups
American experimental rock groups
Musical groups from San Francisco